Jerusalem: The Three Roads to the Holy Land is a 2002 historical adventure game. The game was developed by Arxel Tribe and Réunion des Musées Nationaux, and published by Cryo Interactive. It is a sequel to the game Pompei: The Legend of Vesuvius.

Development 
The game consists of a series of 75 interactive screens. The sets were reconstructed and validated with help from the Réunion des Musées Nationaux. The characters were made through photorealistic 3D modeling.

Plot 
When a Scottish cartographer by the name of Adrien Blake returns from an expedition he discovers that his fiancée, Sophia, has disappeared. He must travel to Jerusalem to search for her. The story unfolds in the year 1552.

Critical reception 
Jihem of JeuxVideo noted that the game had inferior graphics, while expressing that it would appeal to intellectual history enthusiasts. Laura MacDonald of Just Adventure negatively compared the game to Syberia, and suggested that Putt Putt Travels Through Time was a more sincere game than Jerusalem. 4 Players' Bodo Naser thought the game was too linear and had conversations that felt like the silent player hearing monologues from characters. Slydos of Adventure-Archiv thought the game was very short.

References

External links 
 Main page
 Jerusalem: The Three Roads to the Holy Land at Microïds
 Press article 1
 Press article 2
 Press article 3
 PC Pointer review
 Games Flow review
 Tiscali review
 NQuest review
 Absolute Games review

2002 video games
Cryo Interactive games
Fiction set in the 1550s
First-person adventure games
History educational video games
Classic Mac OS games
Microïds games
Ottoman Empire in fiction
Point-and-click adventure games
Religion in popular culture
Video games about time travel
Video games developed in Slovenia
Video game sequels
Video games set in Jerusalem
Video games set in the 16th century
Windows games
Arxel Tribe games